Gerard Joseph Armstrong (born 23 May 1954) is a former Northern Ireland international footballer who played for Tottenham Hotspur.

He spent the majority of his career in England, as well as having a spell in Spain. He represented the Northern Ireland national football team and won acclaim at the 1982 FIFA World Cup, where he was the highest scoring player from the UK; this included a shock winner against hosts Spain. He currently works as a football analyst.

Playing career

Domestic career
Armstrong, who supported English club Leeds United as a boy, began his career in Northern Ireland with St Paul's Swifts. He only started to play football as a teenager when serving a ban from Gaelic football, and feels that his late start in the game was a significant disadvantage.

He subsequently moved on to play for Cromac Albion and Bangor.

In November 1975, Armstrong moved to England, signing with Tottenham Hotspur for a fee of £25,000. He made his Spurs debut in a 3–1 defeat at Ipswich Town on 21 August 1976, aged 22. He made a total of 84 league appearances for Spurs, scoring 10 goals.

In November 1980 he was signed by Second Division side Watford for £250,000. Watford were promoted to the First Division in the 1981–82 season, and Armstrong scored the club's first ever goal in the top flight.

In August 1983, he moved to Spain with RCD Mallorca for £200,000. Following the goal he scored against Spain in the 1982 World Cup, he was the subject of abuse from opposition fans.

Armstrong returned to England in August 1985, signing for West Bromwich Albion on a free transfer. In January 1986 he was loaned to Chesterfield, whom he joined permanently in March 1986 until the end of the season. On his debut, Armstrong scored for the Spireites in a 3–1 home defeat to Brentford. He signed for Brighton & Hove Albion on a free transfer in August 1986. In January 1987, he was loaned to Millwall.

By 1988, Armstrong had become a player-coach at Brighton, but left the club after an altercation with a fan. In February 1989, he took up the same position at Crawley Town, before leaving in March 1990 after another confrontation with a fan. He joined Glenavon as a player the same month, and by April 1990 he was also playing midweek games for Bromley.

Armstrong last played competitive football for Brighton-based non-league side Whitehawk in 1997–98, making a scoring debut on 9 December 1997 in 3-1 Sussex County League Cup defeat at Burgess Hill Town. He played twice more in the league for Whitehawk that season.

International career
In April 1977 Armstrong made his debut for the Northern Ireland national team. He played alongside George Best in a 5–0 friendly defeat to West Germany.

Five years later, Armstrong was selected for the Northern Ireland squad for the 1982 FIFA World Cup in Spain. After a 0–0 draw in their opening match against Yugoslavia, Armstrong scored the opening goal in the 1–1 draw against Honduras. With Northern Ireland requiring a win to progress to the next stage, Armstrong scored a 47th-minute goal against hosts Spain in Valencia. Northern Ireland even had Mal Donaghy sent off, but held on to win 1–0.

In the next stage, also a group round, Northern Ireland drew 2–2 with Austria, with Armstrong scoring in the subsequent 4–1 loss to France.

Armstrong made a total of six appearances for Northern Ireland in the World Cup.

International goals
 
Scores and results list Northern Ireland's goal tally first.

Coaching
In November 1991, Armstrong was appointed manager of non-league club Worthing, leading them to promotion in 1993. In 1994, he became assistant manager of the Northern Ireland national team, under his former national teammate Bryan Hamilton. In 1995, he left Worthing, and in March 1996 he was appointed a Surrey FA youth coach.

In 2004, he reprised his role as Northern Ireland assistant manager under Lawrie Sanchez. He left the position in August 2006 to concentrate on other commitments, as it was revealed that he and his wife Debby were expecting a child.

Football media
Armstrong had combined his coaching positions with employment in football journalism - in television, in radio and in print. He works as a co-commentator for Sky Sports' coverage of La Liga and also works as an analyst for the Premier League coverage of ESPN Star Sports.

He used to work on talkSPORT radio presenting their show that looked at European Football on Monday night with Gab Marcotti but Armstrong has since left the station.  He is an outspoken critic of the amount of diving in the modern game.

Armstrong has appeared on Singaporean media as an analyst on SingTel mio TV's 2014 World Cup coverage which was mirrored on The Straits Times.

He currently co-commentates for Virgin Media TV in Ireland.

Personal life

Gerry Armstrong is married.

Playing honours
Northern Ireland
British Home Championship winners: 1980, 1984

References 

1954 births
Living people
1982 FIFA World Cup players
1986 FIFA World Cup players
Bangor F.C. players
Brighton & Hove Albion F.C. players
British association football commentators
Chesterfield F.C. players
Expatriate footballers in Spain
Expatriate sportspeople from Northern Ireland in Spain
Association football forwards
NIFL Premiership players
La Liga players
Millwall F.C. players
Association footballers from Northern Ireland
Expatriate association footballers from Northern Ireland
Northern Ireland international footballers
Association footballers from Belfast
RCD Mallorca players
English Football League players
Tottenham Hotspur F.C. players
Watford F.C. players
West Bromwich Albion F.C. players
Whitehawk F.C. players
Sports journalists from Northern Ireland